Eric Trolle (1863–1934) was a Swedish diplomat who held several posts, including minister of foreign affairs and governor of Östergötland County.

Biography
Trolle was born in 1863. He worked at the Ministry of Foreign Affairs in various capacities. Trolle was appointed minister of foreign affairs in 1905 which he held until 1909. Then he served as the Swedish ambassador to German Empire between 1909 and 1912. In 1912 he was named as the governor of Östergötland County and remained in the office until his resignation in 1930. Next he was made the Reich Marshal in 1930.

He married Alice Trolle (1872–1953) in 1893, and they had two children. Eric Trolle died of pneumonia at the Mössebergs sanatorium in Stockholm in 1934 while serving as Reich Marshal.

References

External links

20th-century diplomats
20th-century Swedish politicians
1863 births
1934 deaths
Ambassadors of Sweden to Germany
Swedish Ministers for Foreign Affairs
County governors of Sweden
Marshals of the Realm
Deaths from pneumonia in Sweden
Honorary Knights Grand Cross of the Royal Victorian Order